Eva Tamargo (born December 24, 1960) is an American actress, best known for her roles as Pilar Lopez-Fitzgerald on the NBC daytime soap opera Passions (1999—2008), and as Celine Gonzales in the Oprah Winfrey Network primetime soap opera The Haves and the Have Nots.

Life and career
Tamargo was born in Brooklyn, New York, to Cuban immigrants. She was married to Michael Lemus from 1985 to 2003 and is sometimes credited as "Eva Tamargo Lemus". She is the daughter of the Cuban journalist Agustin Tamargo and Rosalba Nápoles. She has two children, Matthew and Gabriella.

From 1999 to 2008 Tamargo played Pilar Lopez-Fitzgerald in NBC soap opera Passions. Tamargo is also known in the international Latino community for her work on the daytime  telenovela El Magnate as well as the reality dating show La Cenicienta. She has appeared in television, radio and print commercials as well as stage work with the Repertorio Español in New York City. She also starred in Marielena and Más Sabe el Diablo, and a guest appearance on NCIS.

In 2013 Tamargo was cast as Celine Gonzales, the spiteful domestic of John Schneider and Reneé Lawless in Oprah Winfrey Network primetime soap opera The Haves and the Have Nots. As of June 2020, Tamargo signed an exclusive management deal with Chris Giovanni at CGEM Talent in Los Angeles.

Filmography

References

External links

1960 births
Living people
Hispanic and Latino American actresses
American soap opera actresses
American telenovela actresses
People from Brooklyn
Actresses from New York City
American television actresses
20th-century American actresses
21st-century American actresses